The Randall Carr brook is a river in Derbyshire, England. It starts at Combs and flows to Whaley Bridge where it ends in the river Goyt. Its headwaters were dammed to create Combs Reservoir which supplies the Peak Forest Canal.

External links
 Geograph view of the valley of the Randall Carr

Rivers of Derbyshire